Roger Miret and the Disasters is the debut studio album by Roger Miret and the Disasters. It was released on September 10, 2002.

"New York Belongs to Me" is a cover of Cock Sparrer's "England Belongs to Me", with a few word changes. The cover originally appeared on Worldwide Tribute to the Real Oi, Vol. 2

Track listing
All songs by Roger Miret and the Disasters unless otherwise noted.
 "Run, Johnny, Run" – 2:26
 "Kiss, Kiss. Kill, Kill" – 1:44
 "Give 'Em the Boot" – 2:08
 "Radio, Radio" – 2:14
 "It's Alright" – 2:12
 "Boys Will Be Boys" – 1:54
Contains an interpolation of "Ole, Ole, Ole (We Are the Champions)" (Dee/Verlooven)
 "Screw You" – 2:30
 "Smash It Up" – 2:45
 "Punch the Clock" – 2:26
 "Gal Friend" – 2:00
 "Just Us" – 2:05
 "Breakaway" – 2:07
 "Look At Me" – 1:53
 "New York Belongs to Me" (Steve Bruce, Steve Burgess, Colin McFaull, Mick Beaufoy) – 2:53

Credits
 Roger Miret – vocals, guitar
 Rhys Kill – guitar
 Johnny Rioux – bass, vocals
 Johnny Kray – drums
 Kirsten de Boer – piano on "Kiss Kiss Kill Kill", guest vocals on "Give 'Em the Boot" "Radio, Radio"
 Al Barr – guest vocals on "Screw You"
 Ken Casey – guest vocals on Give 'Em the Boot
 Stephanie Doughtery – guest vocals on "Radio, Radio" and "Boys Will Be Boys"

Roger Miret and The Disasters albums
2002 debut albums
Hellcat Records albums